KUHH-LP (101.1 FM) is a radio station licensed to serve the community of Hilo, Hawaii. The station is owned by the University of Hawaii at Hilo. It airs a variety radio format.

The station was assigned the KUHH-LP call letters by the Federal Communications Commission on February 26, 2014.

KUHH-LP (101.1 FM), also known at University of Hawaii at Hiloʻs campus community as University Radio Hilo (URH), provides the opportunity for UHH students to gain experience, education and training in radio broadcasting. URH also strives to improve the quality of life for the university community and general public through the broadcast of diverse, musical, cultural, educational and informative programming. All DJs and radio personalities who are live on-air are either current University of Hawaii at Hilo or Hawaiʻi Community College students, or University of Hawaii at Hilo alumni who were KUHH-LP (101.1 FM)staff or DJs as students.

The vision of URH can be broken up into two parts:

● Promote unity and cohesiveness for the University of Hawaii at Hilo Campus

● Provide alternative and educational radio

URH encourages all members to be unique, creative, and original when choosing the material and
format of shows. The individuality that goes into the various shows is what provides URH with its
unique programming.

References

External links
 Official Website
 

UHH-LP
UHH-LP
UHH-LP
Radio stations established in 2015
2015 establishments in Hawaii
Variety radio stations in the United States
Hawaii County, Hawaii